Stanborough Park, also referred to as Stanborough Lakes is a  park in Welwyn Garden City, Hertfordshire, England.

The park features two lakes, which were opened more recently in 1970. They are man-made and were built as a result of gravel extraction at the time of the building of the A1(M) motorway, although the thought of a riverside park had been considered since the city's Master Plan of 1949. The whole park is completely man-made from an old quarry site creating the lakes and the hills around them.

It is a shallow lake, under three feet in depth with several small islands. The boating lake is fed by water from the River Lea at its north end and from a spring. Excess water flows over a weir back into the river at the south end. Coarse fish such as carp are bred in the boating lake and fishing is banned here. Rowing boats are available to hire at only £7.50. The boating lake also sells ice-creams, chocolate bars, fizzy drinks, fishing nets, hot drinks, duck food and more.

This lake has no islands but is deeper than the boating lake, more than six and a half feet deep in places. Unlike the Boating Lake the Sailing Lake is ground water fed. Before the lakes were built the River Lea used to flow through part of the Sailing Lake but it was re-directed to the west side. Many watersport activities take place here, including sailing, windsurfing and angling.

At the south end of the park there is access to Stanborough Reedmarsh, a Local Nature Reserve managed by the Herts and Middlesex Wildlife Trust.

In November 2008, several hundred Lombardy Poplar trees in the South Car Park were chopped down by Welwyn Hatfield Borough Council despite widespread local protest.

References

External links

Official website

Parks and open spaces in Hertfordshire
Lakes of Hertfordshire
Boating lakes